The Kirwan Escarpment is a prominent northwest-facing escarpment which lies south of the Penck Trough in Queen Maud Land, Antarctica. At least the northern end of this feature (Neumayer Cliffs) was included in the aerial photography of the general area by the Third German Antarctic Expedition (1938–39), but the maps resulting from that expedition do not portray the escarpment properly. The escarpment was mapped by Norwegian cartographers from surveys and air photos (1958–59) and named for Laurence P. Kirwan, Director of the Royal Geographical Society.

Skavlsletta Flat is a small ice-covered area lying between Svartbandufsa Bluff and Tverregga Spur in the Kirwan Escarpment. Norwegian cartographers named it Skavlsletta, meaning "the snowdrift plain". The Duken Flat is located near the southwest end of the escarpment.

See also
Svelget

References

Landforms of Queen Maud Land
Escarpments of Antarctica
Princess Martha Coast